Charles Carson (born March 13, 1957, in Montreal) is a Canadian painter. In 2013, he was named "Grand Master of Fine Arts" by The International Academy of Fine Arts of Quebec.

He is the inventor of Carsonism (from French carsonisme), a painting technique named after him.

References

1957 births
Living people
Artists from Montreal
21st-century Canadian painters
Canadian male painters
21st-century Canadian male artists